Nicholas Colin Kay (born 3 August 1992) is an Australian professional basketball player for Shimane Susanoo Magic of the Japanese B.League. He is also a member of the Australian national team, helping the Boomers win bronze at the Tokyo Olympics.

Early life
Kay was born and raised in Tamworth, New South Wales. At age 17, he moved to Sydney to attend Newington College, where he was selected to the Australian under 19s team.

College career
Kay played college basketball in the United States for the Metropolitan State University of Denver from 2011 to 2015. Teaming up with countryman Mitch McCarron, Kay helped lead the Roadrunners to four consecutive NCAA tournaments and a national runner-up finish in 2013. Kay was twice named first-team All-Rocky Mountain Athletic Conference (RMAC) and in 2014 was Most Valuable Player of the RMAC Tournament.

Professional career
In 2014 and 2015, Kay played in the Queensland Basketball League for the Northside Wizards.

In July 2015, Kay signed with the Townsville Crocodiles. He appeared in all 28 games for the Crocs in 2015–16 and ranked top-20 in the NBL for minutes played (28.11 per game). He averaged 10.7 points, 6.6 rebounds and 1.2 assists per game, while scoring in double figures on 16 occasions, recording three double-doubles and finishing as the league leader in offensive rebounding (3.0). He was subsequently named NBL Rookie of the Year.

After a stint in New Zealand with the Southland Sharks, Kay joined the Illawarra Hawks ahead of the 2016–17 NBL season. He helped the Hawks reach the grand final in 2017 and then returned to the Sharks for a second season.

On 20 April 2018, after two seasons with the Illawarra Hawks, Kay signed a three-year deal with the Perth Wildcats. In February 2019, he became just the 12th Wildcat to be named in the All-NBL First Team. In March 2019, he won his first NBL championship as a member of the Wildcats.

On 9 April 2019, Kay signed with the Wellington Saints for the 2019 New Zealand NBL season.

With the Wildcats in 2019–20, Kay was named to the All-NBL First Team for the second straight year and helped the team return to the NBL Grand Final. In game three of the grand final series against the Sydney Kings, Kay had a career-best game with 30 points and seven 3-pointers to go with 12 rebounds and four assists in a 111–96 win.

On 4 May 2020, Kay opted out of the final year of his contract with the Wildcats to pursue international opportunities after the NBL implemented salary cuts due to the COVID-19 pandemic.

On 5 July 2020, Kay signed with Real Betis of the Liga ACB.

On 1 July 2021, Kay signed with Shimane Susanoo Magic of the Japanese B.League. He re-signed with Shimane on 22 June 2022.

National team career
After playing for Australia's youth teams previously, Kay was named to the Australian national team for the 2017 FIBA Asia Cup. In 2018, he won a gold medal with Australia at the Commonwealth Games. At the 2019 Australian Basketball Hall of Fame awards night, Kay was recognised alongside Nathan Sobey with the 2019 Gaze Family Medal for performances at the World Cup Qualifiers and the Commonwealth Games.

In February 2021, Kay was named in the Boomers' Olympic squad. He went on to help the Boomers win the bronze medal. He averaged 11.0 points and 6.3 rebounds in six games.

In February 2022, Kay was named in a 17-man Australian Boomers squad ahead of the FIBA World Cup Qualifiers in Japan. He re-joined the team later that year for the next qualifying window.

References

External links

Shimane Susanoo Magic profile
Illawarra Hawks profile
Metro State Roadrunners bio
"Workmanlike Perth Wildcats forward Nick Kay belongs in MVP conversation" at thewest.com.au
"Kay Ready for #NBL20 Fireworks" at nbl.com.au

1992 births
Living people
2019 FIBA Basketball World Cup players
Australian expatriate basketball people in Japan
Australian expatriate basketball people in New Zealand
Australian expatriate basketball people in Spain
Australian expatriate basketball people in the United States
Australian men's basketball players
Basketball players at the 2018 Commonwealth Games
Basketball players at the 2020 Summer Olympics
Centers (basketball)
Commonwealth Games gold medallists for Australia
Commonwealth Games medallists in basketball
Illawarra Hawks players
Liga ACB players
Medalists at the 2020 Summer Olympics
Metro State Roadrunners men's basketball players
Olympic basketball players of Australia
Olympic bronze medalists for Australia
Olympic medalists in basketball
People from Tamworth, New South Wales
People educated at Newington College
Perth Wildcats players
Power forwards (basketball)
Real Betis Baloncesto players
Shimane Susanoo Magic players
Southland Sharks players
Townsville Crocodiles players
Wellington Saints players
Basketball players from New South Wales
Medallists at the 2018 Commonwealth Games